James Robert Mann (October 20, 1856 – November 30, 1922) was an American politician and attorney who served as a member of the United States House of Representatives from Illinois from 1897 to 1922. He was a member of the Republican Party, and served as House Minority Leader from 1911 to 1919.

Early life and education 
James Robert Mann was born near Bloomington, McLean County, Illinois, on October 20, 1856. His older brother was Frank Irving Mann (1854-1937) farmer, editor of the Prairie Farmer news publication, and author of The Farmers Creed. 

Mann attended University of Illinois and graduated in 1876. He graduated from Union College of Law in 1881 and became a lawyer in Chicago. Mann held several local political offices before serving in the House of Representatives.

Career 
He was admitted to the Illinois bar in 1881 and commenced his practice in Chicago. He held several local offices before being elected as a congressman:

 Member of the Oakland Board of Education in Chicago (1887)
 Attorney for Hyde Park and the South Park commissioners of Chicago
 Chairman of the Illinois State Republican convention (1894)
 Member of the City Council of Chicago (1892–1896)
 Master in chancery of the Superior Court of Cook County
 Chairman of the Republican county conventions at Chicago (1895, 1902)
 Elected as Republican (1896) to the 55th Congress with 13 successive terms

Service in the House 
 Chairman, Committee on Elections No. 1 (58th–60th Congresses)
 Committee on Interstate and Foreign Commerce (61st Congress)
 Committee on Women Suffrage (66th Congress)
 Minority Leader (62nd–65th Congresses)

Notable legislation 

Congressman Mann was one of the sponsors of the Mann-Elkins Act, which gave more power to the Interstate Commerce Commission to regulate railroad rates. He is probably best known for his authorship of the Mann Act of 1910, which was a reaction to the "white slavery" issue and prohibited transportation of women between states for purposes of prostitution. He introduced legislation that became the Pure Food and Drugs Act of 1906.

He was considered to be a leader in the cause of amending the United States Constitution to grant suffrage to women. However, he was quoted as saying, "'They should have been at home where they belonged,' referring to the women in the pageant." He was a leading opponent of the Harrison Act and Prohibition, despite the popularity of such legislation amongst his fellow Midwestern progressives.

Death 

Mann died in Washington, D.C., of pneumonia on November 30, 1922, at age 66 before the close of the 67th United States Congress. He was interred in Oak Woods Cemetery in Chicago.

Electoral history

See also 
 List of United States Congress members who died in office (1900–49)

References

Further reading 
 Ellis, L. Ethan. "James Robert Mann: Legislator Extraordinary". Journal of the Illinois State Historical Society 46 (Spring 1953): 28–44. .
 Extended bibliography – United States Congress website

External links 

 James R. Mann, late a representative

1856 births
1922 deaths
Anti–human trafficking activists
Chicago City Council members
Deaths from pneumonia in Washington, D.C.
Mann Act
Minority leaders of the United States House of Representatives
Northwestern University Pritzker School of Law alumni
People from Bloomington, Illinois
Republican Party members of the United States House of Representatives from Illinois
University of Illinois Urbana-Champaign alumni